Lars Weißenfeldt (born February 15, 1980, in Marburg) is a retired German footballer.

References

1980 births
Living people
German footballers
Sportspeople from Marburg
VfB Marburg players
Eintracht Frankfurt players
Eintracht Frankfurt II players
Kickers Offenbach players
FSV Frankfurt players
Bundesliga players
Association football defenders
Footballers from Hesse